The Voice of Frank Sinatra is the first studio album by American singer Frank Sinatra, released on Columbia Records, catalogue C-112, March 4, 1946.  It was first issued as a set of four 78 rpm records totaling eight songs, the individual discs given Columbia 78 catalog numbers 36918, 36919, 36920, and 36921. The album went to number 1 on the fledgling Billboard chart. It stayed at the top for seven weeks in 1946, spending a total of eighteen weeks on the charts. The album chart consisted of just a Top Five until August 1948. The cover depicted is that of the original 78 rpm release cover, also used on the compact disc reissue.

Content
The tracks were arranged and conducted by Axel Stordahl and his orchestra, on both dates consisting of a string quartet and four-piece rhythm section, augmented by flutist John Mayhew in July, and, given the part he played with Sinatra at Columbia in the early 1950s, oboist Mitch Miller in December. Sinatra recorded most of these songs again at later stages in his career.

Certain critics have claimed The Voice to be the first concept album. Beginning in 1939, however, singer Lee Wiley started releasing albums of 78s dedicated to the songs of a single writer, such as Cole Porter, a precursor to the Songbooks sets formulated by Norman Granz and Ella Fitzgerald in 1956. These may loosely be termed concept albums, although with The Voice, Sinatra inaugurated his practice of having a common mood, theme, or instrumentation tying the songs together on a specific release.

It also holds the distinction of being the first pop album catalogue item at 33⅓ rpm, when Columbia premiered long-playing vinyl records in 1948, ten-inch and twelve-inch format for classical music, ten-inch only for pop. The Voice was reissued as a 10-inch LP, catalogue number CL 6001 in 1948, with the running order altered from the sequence of the original album of 78s. It was also later issued as two 45 rpm EPs in 1952 with catalogue number B-112, a 12-inch LP with a changed running order including only five of the original tracks in 1955 with catalogue number CL-743, and a compact disc with extra tracks in 2003.

Track listing

10-inch LP release

2003 reissue bonus tracks

1955 track listing

Personnel
 Frank Sinatra – vocal
 Axel Stordahl – arranger

New York sessions
 Leonard Posner. Raoul Polikian – violins
 Sidney Brecher – viola
 Anthony Sophos – cello
 Mitch Miller – oboe
 Matty Golizio – guitar
 Bill Clifton – piano
 Frank Siravo – bass
 Nat Polen – drums

Hollywood sessions
 Mischa Russell, David Frisina – violins
 Sam Freed – viola
 Fred Goerner – cello
 Jack Mayhew – flute
 George Van Eps – guitar
 Mark McIntyre – piano
 John Ryan – bass
 Ray Hagan – drums

Production personnel
 Bill Richards – producer
 Charles L. Granata, Didier C. Deutsch – compact disc reissue producers

Charts
Weekly Charts

Year-end charts

References

Frank Sinatra albums
1946 debut albums
Columbia Records albums
Legacy Recordings albums
Albums arranged by Axel Stordahl
Albums conducted by Axel Stordahl